Marie Françoise Sophie Gay (born Nichault de la Valette; 1 July 1776 – 2 March 1852) was a French author who was born in Paris.

Biography
Marie Françoise Sophie Nichault de la Vallette was the child of Francesca Peretti, an Italian woman and of Auguste Antoine Nichault de la Vallette, an entrepreneur who worked for Louis XVIII of France.

Sophie was married in 1794 to Gaspard Liottier (or Gaspar Liottier). She divorced in 1799 to marry another, Jean Sigismond Gay (1768–1822), the mayor of Lupigny, originally from Aix-les-Bains and with a close association to the French treasury, under the French First Empire. He was the contrôleur-général for the Ruhr.

This marriage, some may say a marriage of convenience, allowed both Sophie and her husband to mix in high society. They spent most of their lives around those of the upper class in Aix-la-Chapelle, with those who were trying to establish the town of Spa, Belgium, and particularly with Pauline Bonaparte. Sophie's , women of the chattering classes, was often supplemented by artists, musicians, writers and drawers, and painters, who loved her for her wit, beauty, and largesse.

Sophie published her first written work in 1802, defending the art of the novel. Delphine by Germaine de Staël, wrote an open letter to the Journal de Paris which is still on record.

The same year, her first novel, her first published work, Laure d’Estell, was anonymously published, on the advice of her publisher Sir Stanislas de Boufflers and Joseph-Alexandre Pierre de Ségur, Viscount of Ségur.

Ten years later, Sophie published Léonie de Montbreuse, which was critically acclaimed by Charles Augustin Sainte-Beuve as her best novel, but Anatole of 1815, a story of lost romance, may be the most famous of her works.

After Sophie's first successful novel and several others, acclaimed for their style and sweet sincerity, she wrote many others such as Salons célèbres in 1837, which was critically acclaimed.

Sophie also worked in the theatre, she was the writer of several theatrical comedies and libretti for opera.

Legacy

Sophie Gay was the mother of the writer Delphine de Girardin, and her son-in-law married the chanteuse Sophie Gail.

In 1818, Sophie wrote the libretto for the opéra comique  by Regnard, which Sophie Gail set to music.

In the meantime, Sophie was also writing many others comedies and dramas. The comedy  ("The widow of the tanner"), was a huge success at the Castellane, but the Duchesse de Châteauroux bombed at the Théâtre de l'Odéon.

Sophie also wrote several "novel novels", as penny dreadfuls, for La Presse. As an acclaimed musician, she also published numerous romantic songs, accompanied on the piano, for which she wrote both the words and music: Maris is perhaps a best example, although she would also write in the elegiac style.

After being widowed,  between 1826 and 1827 Sophie took a grand tour to Italy with son.

In the later years of her life, Sophie lived at Versailles during the "season". One of Sophie's daughters became the Countess O'Donnell, the other, was more famously known by the name of Delphine de Girardin, the wife of Émile de Girardin.

In her first marriage, Sophie had another sister, who was the Countess of Canclaux.

Some say Sophie also had another brother, who died in the Siege of Constantine of 1830, but others say he survived, continued his education in England, and then returned to France.

 Works 
 Laure d’Estell, par Mme *** ; Paris, 1802, 3 vol. in-12 ;
 Léonie de Montbreuse, Paris, 1813 et 1823, 2 vol. in-12 ; La seconde édition n’est pas anonyme.
 Anatole, Paris, 1815 et 1822, 2 vol. in-12 ;
 Les Malheurs d’un Amant heureux, ouvrage traduit de l’anglais, par M***, auteur de plusieurs ouvrages connus ; Paris, 1818 ; reproduit sous le titre : les Malheurs d’un Amant heureux, ou mémoires d’un aide-de-camp de Napoléon écrits par son valet de chambre, Paris, 1823, 3 vol. in-8° ; Le Marquis de Pomenars, comédie en un acte et en prose, Paris, Ladvocat, 1820, in-8° ;
 Une Aventure du chevalier de Grammont, comédie en trois actes et en vers, Paris, 1822, in-8° ;
 Marie, ou la pauvre fille, drame en trois actes et en prose, Paris, 1824, in-8° ;
 Théobald, épisode de la guerre de Russie, Paris, 1828, 4 vol. in-12 ;
 Le Moqueur amoureux, Paris , 1830, 2 vol. in-8° ;
 Un Mariage sous l’empire, Paris, 1832, 2 vol. in-8° ;
 Scènes du jeune âge, Paris, 1833, 2 vol. in-8° ;
 la Physiologie du Ridicule, Paris, 1833, 2 vol. in-8° ;
 Souvenirs d’une vieille femme, Paris, Michel Lévy frères, 1834, in-8°: extrait des Mémoires de l’auteur ;
 La Duchesse de. Châteauroux, Paris, 1834 et 1839, 2 vol. in-8° ;
 Le Chevalier de Canolle, opéra comique en trois actes, music by Hippolyte-Honoré-Joseph Court de Fontmichel; Paris, 1836, in-8° ;
 la Comtesse d’Egmont, Paris, 1836, 2 vol. in-8° ;
 Les Salons célèbres, Paris, Dumont, 1837, 2 vol. in-8° ;
 Marie de Mancini, Paris, 1840, 2 vol. in-8° ;
 Marie-Louise d’Orléans, Paris, 1842, 2 vol. in-8° ;
 la Duchesse de Chateauroux, drame en quatre actes, joué sur le second Théâtre-Français, le 25 ; Paris, 1844, grand in-8° ;
 Ellénore, Paris, 1844–1846, 4 vol. in-8° ;
 Le joui Frère, Paris, 1845, 3 vol. in 8" ;
 Le Comte de Guiche, Paris, 1845, 3 vol. in-8° ;
 Le Mari confident, Paris, 1849, 2 vol. in-8° ;
 Société du Travail à domicile, discours suivi d’une pétition en vers en faveur de cette œuvre, Versailles, 1849, in-8°.
 Œuvres complètes de Sophie Gay, Paris, M. Lévy, 1864–1885

See also

 Anatole, Paris, Firmin-Didot, 1815
 Ellénore, Paris, M. Lévy frères, 1864
 La Duchesse de Chateauroux, Paris, Michel Lévy frères, 1873
 Laure d’Estell, Paris, C. Pougens ; Henrichs, an X
 Léonie de Montbreuse, Paris, M. Lévy frères, 1864
 Les Malheurs d’un amant heureux, ou Mémoires d’un jeune aide-de-camp de Napoléon Bonaparte, écrits par son valet de chambre, Paris, Boulland et Tardieu, 1823
 Marie-Louise d’Orléans, Paris, M. Lévy frères, 1876
 Théobald, Paris, P. Dupont, 1828

References

 Paul Lafond, L’Aube romantique : Jules de Rességuier et ses amis, Chateaubriand – Émile Deschamps – Sophie Gay – Madame de Girardin – Victor Hugo – Lamartine – H.T. de Latouche – Sainte-Beuve – A. Soumet – Eugène Sue – Alfred de Vigny et autres, Paris, Mercure de France, 1910
 Henri Malo, Une muse et sa mère : Delphine Gay de Girardin, Paris, Émile-Paul Frères, 1924
 Jules Manecy, Une famille de Savoie : celle de Delphine Gay, Aix-les-Bains, E. Gérente, 1904
 Jules Marsan, La Muse française, 1823–1824, Paris, É. Cornély et Cie, 1907–1909

 Sources 
 Ferdinand Hoefer, Nouvelle Biographie générale, t. 19, Paris, Firmin-Didot, 1857, pp. 751–3.
 7 S : Fonds Gay, archives municipales d'Aix-les-Bains, Savoie

Autobiography
For an account of her daughter, Delphine Gay, her mother's work of 1834, Souvenirs d'une vieille femme ("memoirs from an old woman. See also Théophile Gautier's Portraits contemporains and Sainte-Beuve's, Causeries du lundi'' (Monday's chats, essentially).

Her niece was the writer Hortense Allart.

References

External links
 
 
 

19th-century French writers
French opera librettists
1776 births
1852 deaths
Writers from Paris
French women novelists
19th-century French women writers
French salon-holders